UniLang or UniLang Community is a multilingual online collaboration website, with online language resources publicly accessible.

Community
The group is a non-profit organization, made up of members who share a common interest in languages and linguistics. Its resources are produced collaboratively by volunteers and can be edited by any member with access to the Internet.

The community openly discuss, create and support the resources available online. All data, with few exceptions, is licensed under an open license: the UniLang Public License. Members are organized into related groups and coordinate themselves the projects of their interest.

The website make use of online forums to discuss language topics and chat rooms for live interaction with other members. The Chat-box supports a number of Unicode scripts, in order to allow members to write in different languages, including Chinese, Arabic, Spanish, and Russian.

Members can submit their proposed language resources to publication on the website. Some language resources are designed to be printed out. Users can create and publish on the website language quizzes and exercises for the use of the community. A translation interface offers translation of the webpages.

UniLang was a finalist in the Stockholm Challenge 2003/2004.

Language resources
The Of Course Project: The official UniLang manuals that explain how to contribute. There is documentation on how to use the wiki, how to write HTML code for UniLang and how to write stories, dictionaries, quizzes and phrase books from scratch.
On-Line Courses: on-line courses to learn a variety of languages, ranging from a basic to advanced level.
Grammar References: provides grammar resources and vocabulary in a structured form.
The UniLang Wiki: a database of language and linguistic-related information. Any UniLang member may edit and contribute to these pages.
Grammar References: UniLang members can review a language's grammar with the use of grammar references.
Vocabulary Lists & Dictionaries: Available in several languages.
Pronunciation & Script guides: To aid in learning the pronunciation of a certain language and/or writing system.
Phrasebook: Phrase books analogous to traveler's phrase books. Available in many languages.
Stories: Several stories with translation alongside.
Interactive Language Resources: Quizzes, games and exercises, where the members can practice vocabulary and grammar with immediate automatic feedback.

References

External links

Social networking language-learning websites
Translation websites